McMordie is a surname. Notable people with the surname include:

Ali McMordie (born 1959), Northern Irish bass guitarist
Eric McMordie (born 1946), Northern Irish footballer
Julia McMordie (1860–1942), Northern Irish politician
Robert James McMordie (1849–1914), Irish barrister and politician